Loving Miss Hatto is a 2012 British television film directed by Aisling Walsh and starring Maimie McCoy and Francesca Annis as Joyce Hatto and Rory Kinnear and Alfred Molina as William Barrington-Coupe.

Plot
Pianist Joyce Hatto became famous very late in life when unauthorised copies of commercial recordings made by other pianists were released under her name, earning her high praise from critics. The fraud did not come to light until 2007, six months after her death. The film takes a look at two distinct periods of time, firstly the beginning of Joyce's career when she met and married Barrington-Coupe and secondly, with a change of actors, some thirty years later her later life with her husband, her career, illness and death.

Production and broadcast
Loving Miss Hatto was filmed in Ireland and screened on BBC Television on 23 December 2012. The screenplay was by Victoria Wood and the film was made by Left Bank Pictures. Barrington-Coupe was still alive at the time, but Wood stated in an interview with The Guardian that she did not consult him when she was writing the film.

Cast
Francesca Annis as Joyce Hatto
Alfred Molina as William Barrington-Coupe
Maimie McCoy as Young Joyce
Rory Kinnear as Young Barrie
Phoebe Nicholls as Mrs Hatto
Ned Dennehy as Philip
Sarah Woodward as Birdy
Eve Matheson as Pilks
Jane Brennan as Miss Guisely
Ned Dennehy as Philip
Nicholas Rowe as James
Nicholas Woodeson as Erich
Nell Williams as Young Birdy
Susan Loughnane as Publishing girl
Valerie O'Connor as Phylis

Home media
The film was made available on Amazon Prime.

References

External links

British films based on actual events
2012 television films
2012 films
BBC One
British television films
2010s English-language films